Comeback of the Year is an award given by American boxing magazine The Ring. Established in 1922, the award, based on the magazine's writers' criteria, is given to a boxer who has experienced a career resurgence or overcome adversity.

1980s
1980: Shoji Oguma
1981: Jimmy Young
1982: Bobby Chacon
1983: Roberto Durán
1984: Marvin Johnson
1985: Lupe Pintor
1986: Edwin Rosario
1987: Frankie Duarte
1988: Michael Dokes
1989: Roberto Durán

1990s
1990: Tony Lopez
1991: Vinny Pazienza
1992: Iran Barkley
1993: Zack Padilla
1994: George Foreman
1995: Azumah Nelson
1996: Danny Romero
1997: Vince Phillips
1998: Kostya Tszyu
1999: Michael Carbajal

2000s
2000: Virgil Hill
2001: John Michael Johnson
2002: Arturo Gatti
2003: James Toney
2004: Marco Antonio Barrera
2005: Ike Quartey
2006: Oleg Maskaev
2007: Paulie Malignaggi
2008: Vitali Klitschko
2009: Floyd Mayweather Jr.

2010s
2010: Bernard Hopkins
2011: Érik Morales
2012: Daniel Jacobs
2013: Manny Pacquiao
2014: Miguel Cotto
2015: Badou Jack
2016: Andre Ward
2017: Sadam Ali
2018: Tyson Fury
2019: Jamel Herring

2020s
2020: Román González
2021: Kiko Martínez
2022: Kenshiro Teraji

References

External links

Awards established in 1980
Boxing awards
Comeback of the year